Daniel Sánchez Ayala (born 7 November 1990) is a Spanish professional footballer who plays as a defender for  club Blackburn Rovers. His first club was Premier League club Liverpool, where he spent two seasons as a reserve. He joined Norwich City in 2011, and joined Middlesbrough on loan in October 2013, before joining the club on a permanent deal in January 2014. He left Middlesbrough on 27 June 2020 after failing to agree a new contract.

Club career

Liverpool
Born in El Saucejo, Seville, Andalusia, Ayala agreed a move to Liverpool in September 2007 after rejecting a professional contract with Sevilla, where he came through the youth team. Liverpool paid a compensation fee to Sevilla and Ayala was offered a three-year contract. In the 2007–08 season he featured predominantly in the Under-18 team, whilst in the 2008–09 season he split his time between the Under-18 and reserve teams. He played through injury in the FA Youth Cup 2008–09 Final defeat to Arsenal.

Ayala made his senior debut on 16 August 2009 in a Premier League match against Tottenham Hotspur, coming on as a substitute for the injured Martin Škrtel and made his first start against Stoke City at Anfield three days later. On Halloween, he came on as a substitute in Liverpool's 3–1 defeat against Fulham at Craven Cottage, after Jamie Carragher and Philipp Degen were sent off. He also played in Liverpool's 4–0 win over Burnley, subsequently relegating them to the Championship, and Liverpool's 2–0 defeat against Chelsea. On 12 November, it was announced that the player had signed an extended contract keeping him at Liverpool until the summer of 2012.

In September 2010, Ayala joined Championship side Hull City on loan. He started the same day in Hull City's away match at Cardiff City which they lost 2–0. In his second match for the club against Derby County he scored his first goal in a competitive match. On 20 September, Liverpool announced that his loan period had been extended until 1 January. Ayala played 12 times for Hull in all competitions, scoring once. On 27 December, he returned to Liverpool due to an injury crisis.

On 11 February 2011, Derby County finally signed Ayala on a loan deal until the end of the season, after the move was delayed due to the players hamstring injury which he picked up while playing for Hull City. He went on to play 17 times for Derby, making 16 consecutive starts.

Norwich City
On 13 August 2011, Ayala signed for Norwich City for a reported fee of £800,000. The deal officially went through on 16 August 2011. Ayala was handed the number 26 shirt, vacated by Steven Smith and was named in the squad for the Premier League fixture against Stoke City at Carrow Road on 21 August 2011. This was due to Zak Whitbread being rated as doubtful for the fixture after picking up a knee knock against Wigan. He made his debut for Norwich as a second-half substitute for Anthony Pilkington following Leon Barnett's sending off against Stoke.

Ayala suffered a knee injury in the League Cup defeat to Milton Keynes Dons ruling him out for two months. He made his Norwich comeback in the 1–1 draw against Fulham, starting with Zak Whitbread and playing 90 minutes. Ayala was ruled out for a few weeks after suffering a hamstring injury in a 2–0 win over Bolton.

On 7 August 2012, Ayala secured a season-long loan deal with Nottingham Forest. He scored his first goal for the club in a 3–1 home win against Cardiff City.

Middlesbrough
On 23 October 2013, Ayala joined Championship club Middlesbrough on a three-month emergency loan spell. He made his debut for Middlesbrough two days later, when his new side crushed Doncaster Rovers 4–0, taking the honour of scoring on his debut. He bagged in his second goal for the club in his third appearance in their 2–2 draw with Watford, where he scored the equaliser in the final minute of added time.

On 24 January 2014, Ayala joined Middlesbrough on a permanent forty-two month contract. Ayala thus became recently appointed manager Aitor Karanka's first permanent signing for Middlesbrough, with the fee reported to be in the region of £350,000.

He was released upon the expiration of his contract on 30 June 2020.

Blackburn Rovers
On 15 September 2020, Ayala signed for Blackburn Rovers on a 3-year-deal. Ayala made his debut for Blackburn in their 0–0 draw with Cardiff on 3 October. Ayala scored his first goal for Blackburn in the club's 2–1 win against Nottingham Forest on 18 August 2021.

Career statistics

Honours
Middlesbrough
Football League Championship runner-up: 2015–16

Individual
The Football League Team of the Season: 2015–16
PFA Team of the Year: 2015–16 Championship
PFA Fans' Player of the Year: 2015–16 Championship

References

External links

Profile on LFCHistory.net

1990 births
Living people
People from Sierra Sur (Seville)
Sportspeople from the Province of Seville
Spanish footballers
Association football defenders
Liverpool F.C. players
Hull City A.F.C. players
Norwich City F.C. players
Derby County F.C. players
Nottingham Forest F.C. players
Middlesbrough F.C. players
Premier League players
English Football League players
Spain under-21 international footballers
Spanish expatriate footballers
Expatriate footballers in England
Spanish expatriate sportspeople in England